An overshooting top (or penetrating top) is a dome-like protrusion shooting out of the top of the anvil of a thunderstorm and into the lower stratosphere. When an overshooting top is present for 10 minutes or longer, it is a strong indication that the storm is severe.

Formation 

When a thunderstorm forms, clouds build vertically into the atmosphere until the storm's updraft (warm rising air) has reached an equilibrium level (EL); the point where the surrounding air is about the same temperature or even warmer. This point of equilibrium is often marked by the tropopause. Rather than continuing to rise into the stratosphere, the vertical cloud growth abruptly stops, and instead clouds spread horizontally, forming an "anvil" shape on top of the thunderstorm.

An overshooting top forms when a thunderstorm's updraft, due to momentum from rapid ascent and strength of lifting through the free convective layer (FCL), protrudes its equilibrium level, forming a dome-like structure above the anvil. This can occur with any cumulonimbus cloud when instability is high. Whereas anvils form at the equilibrium level, overshooting tops continue to the maximum parcel level (MPL).

Severe weather 

Many thunderstorms exhibit an overshooting top at some point in their life cycle. In weaker thunderstorms, the overshooting top is short-lived, and often takes on a wispy appearance. If the overshooting top is rising and falling in a cyclical fashion with each protrusion persisting only a few minutes, then it could indicate the storm is pulsing and not as strong as a storm with a continuous overshooting top.

An overshooting top lasting for more than 10 minutes is a sign of a strong updraft in a thunderstorm, indicating a strong likelihood the storm is producing severe weather. If the overshooting top is continuous, it's an indication of enhanced probability that the storm is a supercell, i.e. a rotating storm. During a strong tornado, the overshooting top may roll or fold over as new activity climbs up the back while the front of the overshooting top collapses into the storm. During a long-track tornado, the entire top of the storm, including the overshooting top, may drop by thousands of feet.

Storm features 
A storm powerful enough to produce a lasting overshooting top typically produces the following:
 Heavy rain; a deluge of rain could fall from this storm in a short amount of time.
 Strong straight-line wind from downbursts; the storm clouds have powerful winds churning inside them. These winds are likely to be felt at the surface and also a threat to aviation aloft.
 Sometimes a tornado may form; most strong tornadoes are associated with mesocyclones located near the interchange of the rotating updraft and the rear flank downdraft (RFD).
 Hail; if the updraft is strong enough to produce an overshooting top it can also carry large hail.
 A storm that features an overshooting top is a thunderstorm, and is thus likely to produce lightning.

See also 

 Atmospheric convection
 Atmospheric thermodynamics

References

External links 
 http://www.theweatherprediction.com/habyhints/352

Severe weather and convection
Cloud and fog physics
Cumulus